The  is a recreation area, riverfront in the eastern bank of the Imphal River in Imphal, India.
It was developed under the aegis of the "Imphal Smart City Limited" along the bank of the Imphal River.

Early morning walkers are allowed to enter at free of cost until 8 AM.

Etymology 
The term "kanglā" is the name of an important historical place in Imphal, Manipur.

In Meitei language (officially called Manipuri language), "nongpok" means "east". Morphologically, "nong‑pok" is made up of two root words, "nong" and "pok" meaning "day" and "to give birth" respectively.

The Meitei term "torbān" means riverbank. Morphologically, "tor‑bān" is made up of two root words, "tor" and "bān" meaning "river" and "edge" respectively.

Opening and closing 
According to the "Imphal Smart City Limited", the Kangla Nongpok Torban gets closed every Monday for maintenance.

It is opened from 5 AM to 7 PM. Its ticket counter closes at 6:30 PM, half an hour earlier than the park closing time.

Features and facilities 
The Kangla Nongpok Torban has the provisions of open gym, walking track, cycling track, exercise arena, food plaza, kiosks and performance stage.
10 bicycles are available to the visitors, for riding, by booking though a mobile app opened under the smart city project.

During September 2022, the Bio Clean Water Care Service OPC Private Limited installed four bio toilets in the Kangla Nongpok Torban under PPP model. Its service and maintenance are provided by the installing agency without taking any charges from the government.

The 4 toilets are meant for ladies, gents, handicapped and transgender.

Development 
In the first phase of development work, stretching approximately 700 metres of area, the Kangla Nongpok Torban is fully developed starting from "Sanjenthong" to the "Nongpok Thong". 
In the second phase of development work, the Kangla Nongpok Torban is planned to be stretched further from "Nongpok Thong" to "Minuthong".

Campaigns 
On 25 June 2022, a campaign named "Green Imphal City Campaign" was organised under the theme "Planting towards Greener, Cleaner Imphal" by the Department of Municipal Administration, Housing and Urban Development (MAHUD) in the Kangla Nongpok Torban.

See also 
 Kangla Sanathong
 Statue of Meidingu Nara Singh
 Hijagang
 Iputhou Pakhangba Laishang
 Manung Kangjeibung
 Museums in Kangla

References

External links 

 

Cultural heritage of India
Landmarks in India
Meitei culture
Monuments and memorials in India
Monuments and memorials in Imphal
Monuments and memorials in Manipur
Monuments and memorials to Meitei people
Monuments and memorials to Meitei royalties
Public art in India
Tourist attractions in India